The Terror with Women (French: La terreur des dames) is a 1956 comedy film directed by Jean Boyer and starring Noël-Noël, Jacqueline Gauthier and Yves Robert. It is an adaptation of the 1882 short story Ce cochon de Morin by Guy de Maupassant.

The film's sets were designed by the art director Robert Giordani.

Cast
 Noël-Noël as Aimé Morin
 Jacqueline Gauthier as Henriette Bonnel
 Yves Robert as Le journaliste Labarge
 Jacqueline Pagnol as 	Louisette
 Noël Roquevert as Bonnel
 Jean Poiret as Un gendarme
 Michel Serrault as Un gendarme
 Suzet Maïs as Madame Genlis
 Elaine Dana as La strip-teaseuse
 Fernand Sardou as Le commissaire de police

References

Bibliography 
 Dayna Oscherwitz & MaryEllen Higgins. The A to Z of French Cinema. Scarecrow Press, 2009.

External links 
 

1956 films
French comedy films
1956 comedy films
1950s French-language films
Films directed by Jean Boyer
Gaumont Film Company films
Films based on works by Guy de Maupassant
Films based on short fiction
Films with screenplays by René Barjavel
1950s French films
French black-and-white films

fr:La Terreur des dames